Court handball may refer to:

 Indoor handball
 Gaelic handball
 American handball